Slave Market with the Disappearing Bust of Voltaire (1940) is a painting by Spanish Surrealist Salvador Dalí. The painting depicts a slave market, while a woman at a booth watches the people. A variety of people seem to make up the face of Voltaire, while the face seems to be positioned on an object to form a bust of Voltaire. Voltaire was a French writer and philosopher known for his opposition to slavery.

The painting was completed in 1940 in oil on canvas. Dalí describes his work on the painting "to make the abnormal look normal and the normal look abnormal." He uses the technique so called "Double Image", when one form contains two or more images.

References

VanRullen R, Koch Ch. Is perception discrete or continuous ? Trends Cogn  Sci.2003;7(5):207-213.

Further reading 
 Costandi, Mo. "The Ghostly Gaze and the Disappearing Bust of Voltaire". The Guardian (U.S. Edition). Monday 19 September 2011 10.48 EDT.

Paintings by Salvador Dalí
1940 paintings
Cultural depictions of Voltaire
Paintings in St. Petersburg, Florida
Slavery in art